John Jenkins Barrow (born October 31, 1955) is an American politician who was the U.S. representative for  from 2005 to 2015. The district includes much of the Georgia side of the Central Savannah River Area and includes counties as far south as Coffee County and as far west as Laurens County. He is a member of the Democratic Party.

As a Democratic congressman in an increasingly Republican district, Barrow was targeted for defeat by Republican strategists from the time he was first elected. Twice the GOP-controlled Georgia General Assembly redrew his district, forcing him to move first from Athens to Savannah and then from Savannah to Augusta to remain a resident of his district. He was ultimately defeated in his 2014 bid for re-election.

Barrow was the Democratic nominee for Georgia Secretary of State in 2018, but lost in a run-off election.

Education, early career, and family
Barrow was born in Athens, Georgia, to Judge James Barrow and his wife, Phyllis (Jenkins) Barrow, who both had served as military officers during World War II. His family has deep roots in the Athens area, and according to his staff he is a great-great-nephew of David Crenshaw Barrow Jr., for whom nearby Barrow County was named. Through his Barrow ancestors he is related to 19th-century Georgia Gov. Wilson Lumpkin.

Barrow graduated from the University of Georgia with a political science degree in 1976. While a student, he was a member of the university's Demosthenian Literary Society. In 1979, he earned a Juris Doctor degree from Harvard Law School. After graduation, he entered private practice as a lawyer, working until his election to public office. Barrow is married to the former Angèle Hawkins of Atlanta. Together they have 5 children: Charlie, Manette, Alex, James, and Ruth.

Athens-Clarke County politics
In 1990, voters from the City of Athens and Clarke County voted to consolidate the two governing bodies. Barrow was elected to the newly created Athens-Clarke County Commission, representing the county's fourth district. He won re-election in 1992, 1996, and in 2000.

U.S. House of Representatives

Legislation
Barrow sponsored 59 bills of his own, including:

109th Congress (2005–2006)
 H.R. 2073, a bill to create a tax credit for businesses with no more than 50 employees equal to 50% of the amount paid by the employer for health insurance coverage for the business's employees, introduced May 4, 2005. A version of this tax credit would later be included as part of the Patient Protection and Affordable Care Act (PPACA).
 H.R. 5694, introduced June 28, 2006, reintroduced in the 110th Congress as H.R. 1473, the 111th Congress as H.R. 1662 and the 112th Congress as H.R. 4283, a bill to require states to recommend the purchasing of liability insurance for child care centers, and to require child care centers to disclose whether the center carries current liability insurance 1) publicly and conspicuously in the service area of the premises of the center, and 2) in a written notice to each child's parents or legal guardian. Child care centers would be required to receive a signature from at least one of the child's parents verifying that he or she has received the notice, and would be required to maintain records of these signatures while the child is receiving care and for one year thereafter. While this bill has yet to become law, many states, including Georgia, have adopted their own versions of it.

110th Congress (2007–2008)
 H.R. 1563, a bill to require Medicare Advantage organizations to provide at least the same amount provided under Medicare Part A or B if such services had been provided under either of those programs for critical access rural hospitals, introduced March 19, 2007
 H.R. 2398, a bill to create the National Institute of Food and Agriculture to promote research aimed at improving agriculture, introduced June 21, 2007. This bill's provisions were included in the 2008 U.S. farm bill.
 H.R. 3607, a bill to increase the allowable HOPE Scholarship tax credit from $1,000 to $2,000, allow it to be used for four taxable years, and allow it to include expenditures on books, classroom supplies, and housing, introduced September 20, 2007
 H.R. 5897, a bill to create a registry of individuals exposed to excess formaldehyde in the Federal Emergency Management Agency's temporary housing units after Hurricane Katrina, to study the adverse effects of this excess exposure, and to provide free health care and counseling to individuals in the registry who are suffering from adverse effects of excess formaldehyde exposure linked to the temporary housing units, introduced April 24, 2008, reintroduced in the 111th Congress as H.R. 1661
 H.R. 5918, a bill to create a program to make it easier for small businesses to provide health insurance coverage to their employees, introduced April 29, 2008. A version of this program would later be included as the PPACA's Small Business Health Options Program.

111th Congress (2009–2010)
 H.R. 3652, a bill to require the Secretary of Health and Human Services to create minimum education and certification standards for physicians who administer medical imaging and radiation therapy, introduced September 25, 2009
 H.R. 5594, a bill to create a program to award competitive grants to technical schools to pay for up to $2,000 in tuition costs for unemployed individuals enrolled or accepted at the school, introduced June 24, 2010, reintroduced in the 112th Congress as H.R. 2851

112th Congress (2011–2012)
 H.R. 3121, a bill to require Congress to approve of any contract, grant, or loan awarded to any entity from the federal government if its value exceeds $100 million for a single fiscal year, introduced October 6, 2011
 H.R. 4167, a bill to create a refundable tax credit for businesses whose employees' average wages rise in excess of inflation to partially offset these costs, up to a maximum of $500,000 per calendar year, introduced March 8, 2012
 H.R. 6144, a bill to reduce the allowable amount of expenditures on new vehicles for federal employees, excluding vehicles acquired for national security purposes, introduced September 18, 2012
 H.R. 6499, a bill to subject the pay of members of Congress to budgetary cuts under the Gramm–Rudman–Hollings Balanced Budget Act, introduced September 21, 2012

113th Congress (2013–2014)
 H.R. 37, introduced January 3, 2013, a bill to repeal the employer mandate, individual mandate, and the Independent Payment Advisory Board of the PPACA, to prohibit the Environmental Protection Agency from awarding any type of financial assistance to any entity for the purpose of preventing or controlling air pollution if that financial assistance would be used outside of the United States, and to grant the Office of Management and Budget the authority to consolidate existing government agencies and programs if doing so would increase government efficiency. H.R. 37 also contains modified provisions of some bills sponsored by Barrow in the 112th Congress: H.R. 3121, 6144, and 6499.
 H.R. 223, a bill to prohibit states from redrawing congressional districts more than once after each 10-year reapportionment unless ordered to do so by a court so that the districts comply with the U.S. Constitution and the Voting Rights Act of 1965, introduced January 14, 2013
 H.R. 4331, a bill to reduce the number of limousines in the federal vehicle fleet by 50%, introduced March 27, 2014
 H.R. 4591, introduced May 7, 2014, a bill to direct the Secretary of Labor to develop a strategy to deal with the country's skill gap (which the bill defines). H.R. 4591 also contains modified provisions of some bills sponsored by Barrow in the 111th and 112th Congresses: H.R. 5594 and 4167.

Committee assignments
 Committee on Energy and Commerce
 Subcommittee on Environment and Economy
 Subcommittee on Commerce, Manufacturing and Trade
 Subcommittee on Energy and Power
 Subcommittee on Health

Elections

2004

In 2004, Barrow entered the Democratic primary for Georgia's 12th District.  The 12th had been one of the districts Georgia gained as a result of the 2000 United States Census, and stretched from Athens to Augusta.  The district, with its 40% African-American population, had supposedly been drawn for a Democrat.  However, Republican college professor Max Burns had won the seat in 2002 because of ethical questions surrounding the Democratic nominee, Charles "Champ" Walker, Jr. Barrow won a four-way primary and went on to defeat Burns by 52% to 48%.

2006

At the same time Barrow was elected, the Republicans won control of both houses of the Georgia state legislature for the first time since Reconstruction.  One of their first acts was a rare mid-decade redistricting that targeted Barrow and the other white Democrat in the Georgia delegation, Jim Marshall.  One proposed map, seriously considered, would have drawn his home in Athens into the heavily Republican 9th District of seven-term incumbent Nathan Deal, while throwing the other half of Athens into the equally Republican 10th District of six-term incumbent Charlie Norwood.

The final plan was somewhat less draconian, but shifted all of Athens to the 10th District.  Rather than face certain defeat, Barrow moved from his ancestral home of Athens to Savannah in the newly redrawn 12th.  The new 12th was slightly less Democratic than its predecessor.  It now included several Republican-leaning Savannah suburbs that had previously been in the heavily Republican 1st District.  Barrow faced Burns in the general election and won by only 864 votes — the narrowest margin of any Democratic incumbent nationwide.  However, he trounced Burns in Chatham and Richmond counties — home to Democratic-leaning Savannah and Augusta, respectively (as well as more than half the district's population) — by a total of over 17,000 votes.

Barrow's 2006 candidacy faced not only the mid-decade redistricting but also two visits by President George W. Bush to the district, campaigning by national figures on behalf of Burns (including RNC Chair Ken Mehlman and U.S. Speaker of the House Dennis Hastert) and popular Governor Sonny Perdue's reelection bid.

2008

In the 2008 election, Barrow faced a primary challenge from State Senator Regina Thomas, who represents a majority-black district in Savannah. Barrow won the Democratic nomination with 76% of the vote over Thomas with 24% of the vote, 96% of the precincts reporting. He easily defeated his Republican challenger, former congressional aide John Stone, with 66% percent of the vote.

Support for Obama
Barrow aligned himself closely with Barack Obama during the 2008 presidential primary. He endorsed Obama months before he won enough delegates to clinch the nomination. Obama reciprocated by recording a sixty-second radio advertisement for Barrow, who was in a contested primary. Obama said, "We're going to need John Barrow back in Congress to help change Washington and get our country back on track." It was the first time Obama got involved with a Georgia election. Barrow later touted his supported from Obama in a direct-mail piece that said he works "hand-in-hand" with Obama.

2010

Barrow won re-election defeating Republican nominee Ray McKinney 57%-43%.

Augusta Chronicle editorial
In a 2010 editorial, the Augusta Chronicle called John Barrow "perhaps the most shameless, duplicitous, self-serving politician of his era."  The editorial was written after it was discovered that he sent two diametrically opposed mailers to voters in his district  - one saying he works "hand in hand" with President Obama, and another saying he "stood up" to House Speaker Nancy Pelosi. In closing, the editorial stated: "That Mr. Barrow is two-faced has been revealed by his own hand. Why voters would reward that kind of disingenuous condescension is beyond us."

2012

Following the 2010 census, the Republican-controlled state legislature significantly altered the 12th.  It lost its share of Savannah, while gaining all of Augusta and most of its suburbs. However, a number of heavily Republican areas near Savannah remained in the 12th. On paper, the reconfigured 12th was strongly Republican; had it existed in 2008, John McCain would have carried it with 58 percent of the vote.  By comparison, Barack Obama carried the old 12th with 54 percent of the vote.  Since Barrow's home in Savannah was drawn into Jack Kingston's 1st district, he moved to Augusta in the reconfigured 12th and sought election there.

In April 2011, the National Journal named Barrow one of the ten most endangered Democrats.  However, in the general election, Barrow managed to defeat Republican State Representative Lee Anderson 54%-46%.  According to an editorial in the Augusta Chronicle, this was mainly because Anderson was almost invisible during the campaign; notably, he never debated Barrow. Mitt Romney won the district with 55 percent of the vote.

2014

In the 2014 Democratic primaries, Barrow went unopposed. Republican Rick W. Allen defeated John Barrow in the November 2014 elections.

2018

While considered to be a potential candidate for Governor of Georgia in the 2018 election, Barrow decided instead to pursue the office of Georgia Secretary of State. He announced his candidacy on September 24, 2017 and won the Democratic primary. Neither Barrow nor his Republican opponent, Brad Raffensperger, received 50% of the vote in the 2018 general election, so a run-off election was held. In that election, Barrow lost by approximately 57,000 votes.

2020
Barrow unsuccessfully ran for a seat on the Georgia Supreme Court that was made open by the retirement of Justice Robert Benham.

Political views
Barrow is a Blue Dog Democrat  as well as a member of the New Democrat Coalition.  Based on Barrow's bill sponsorship, the GovTrack website had classified him as a centrist Democrat.  Following the defeat of fellow Georgia Democrat Jim Marshall in 2010, he was the only white Democratic congressman from the Deep South.

Barrow got a 75% rating from the NAACP, which indicates a "mixed record" on civil rights; 83% from U.S. Border Control, indicating a "sealed-border stance"; 25% from Americans United for Separation of Church and State, indicating a "mixed record on church-state separation"; 0% from Citizens for Tax Justice, indicating opposition to progressive tax structure; 100% from the Campaign for America's Future, indicating support for energy independence; -10 from NORML, indicating a "hard-on-drugs" stance; 36% from the National Right to Life Committee, indicating a mixed record on abortion.

Health care
In November 2009, Barrow was one of 39 Democrats to vote against the Affordable Health Care for America Act. In March 2010, he was one of 34 to vote against the Health Care and Education Reconciliation Act of 2010. The bill passed the House 219-212.
In January 2011, Barrow voted against repealing the law.

Gun rights
Rep. Barrow received more money from the National Rifle Association (NRA) during the 2014 election cycle than any other Democrat in the nation ($9,900).

Gay rights
Barrow voted to repeal "don't ask, don't tell," and he voted for the Matthew Shepard Hate Crimes Act.  He supported conferring marriage benefits to same sex couples by means of civil unions but was opposed to gay marriage.  During his first campaign he was accused of flip-flopping on the issue of a proposed constitutional amendment that would ban same sex marriage, but he defended his position by explaining that the amendment he opposed would have prevented states from recognizing civil unions while the amendment he supported would have allowed states to recognize civil unions.  He voted to uphold the Defense of Marriage Act, which allowed states to recognize same-sex marriages but also allowed states to refuse to recognize same sex marriages granted under the laws of other states.

Abortion
Barrow's voting record on abortion is mixed.  In 2007, Barrow received a 100% approval rating from NARAL Pro-Choice America, a pro-choice group, and also received a 0% approval rating from the National Right to Life Committee, a pro-Life organization.  However, in 2006, he received only a 35% approval rating from NARAL, and in November 2009, he voted to allow insurance plans to offer abortion coverage, as long as it wasn't subsidized by the government.

Stimulus spending
Barrow voted for the American Recovery and Reinvestment Act.  He was one of 44 Democrats in the House to vote against the American Clean Energy and Security Act, also known as the cap and trade bill.

Intellectual property
In 2011, Rep. Barrow became a co-sponsor of Bill H.R.3261 otherwise known as the Stop Online Piracy Act.

References

External links

 
 

|-

|-

|-

|-

1955 births
21st-century American politicians
Democratic Party members of the United States House of Representatives from Georgia (U.S. state)
Georgia (U.S. state) city council members
Georgia (U.S. state) lawyers
Harvard Law School alumni
Living people
Politicians from Athens, Georgia
University of Georgia alumni